Gauthier Hein (born 7 August 1996) is a French professional footballer who plays for Auxerre as a winger.

Career
Hein began playing football with the youth academy of Thionville at the age of 4. He joined the youth academy of Metz at the age of 12, and worked his way up their youth teams and reserves. 

On 23 May 2019, he signed his first professional contract with Metz, keeping him at the club until 2019. He signed on loan with Tours for the 2017-18 season. He then returned to Metz for the 2018-19 season, extending his contract by one more season until 2020. For the 2019-20 season, he joined Valenciennes on loan.

On 26 June 2020, Hein transferred to Auxerre, signing a 3-year contract. He was one of the nominees for the 2021 FIFA Puskás Award, for a goal he scored against Niort.

Personal life
Hein was a national champion in table tennis in his age group at the age of 12, and at 13 had to decide between pursuing football or tennis professionally.

Honours
Individual
UNFP Ligue 2 Team of the Year: 2021–22

References

External links

Living people
1996 births
Sportspeople from Moselle (department)
People from Thionville
Association football wingers
French footballers
FC Metz players
Tours FC players
Valenciennes FC players
AJ Auxerre players
Ligue 1 players
Ligue 2 players
Championnat National 2 players
Championnat National 3 players
Footballers from Grand Est